Björnlandet is a national park in Västerbotten County, northern Sweden.

The park is notable for its large primeval forest and a geography that is distinguished by steep ravines and precipices. The fauna is comparatively of lower interest, due to the harsh climate and environment.

References

External links 
 Sweden's National Parks: Björnlandet National Park from the Swedish Environmental Protection Agency

Lapland (Sweden)
National parks of Sweden
Geography of Västerbotten County
Protected areas established in 1991
1991 establishments in Sweden
Tourist attractions in Västerbotten County